Hooker Jim (1851–1879), or Hooka Jim, was a Modoc warrior who played a pivotal role in the Modoc War. Hooker Jim was the son-in-law of tribal medicine man Curley Headed Doctor.  After white settlers massacred Modoc women and children contemporaneously with the Battle of Lost River, Hooker Jim led a group of Modocs overland to Captain Jack's Stronghold.  During their march, Hooker Jim and his warriors killed several white settlers in revenge.

Captain Jack, the Modoc chief, repeatedly refused to hand Hooker Jim and the other Modocs who had killed the settlers over to white authorities.  Hooker Jim then coerced Captain Jack into murdering General Edward Canby at a peace council.

Soon after, as the Army invaded the Lava Beds where Captain Jack had taken refuge, Hooker Jim abandoned Captain Jack and surrendered to the Army.  Hooker Jim was part of the "Modoc Bloodhounds" used by the Army to capture Jack. After Captain Jack was finally captured, Hooker Jim testified against his chief in exchange for amnesty. Hooker Jim followed the tribe in exile to Oklahoma and died there in 1879.

References 

1851 births
1879 deaths
Modoc people
People of the Modoc War
Native American people of the Indian Wars
19th-century Native Americans